Janez Poklukar is a Slovenian politician and doctor. , he is Minister of Health in the 14th Government of Slovenia. Previously he held the position of CEO in Ljubljana University Medical Centre.

References 

Living people
Year of birth missing (living people)
Place of birth missing (living people)
Health ministers of Slovenia
21st-century Slovenian politicians